The 1907 Penn Quakers football team represented the University of Pennsylvania in the 1907 college football season. They finished with an 11–1 record and claim 1907 as a national championship season. They outscored their opponents 256 to 40.

Schedule

References

Penn
Penn Quakers football seasons
College football national champions
Penn Quakers football